Patrick Gregory McGovern (1875 – 7 February 1949) was an Irish politician. He was born in Clarbally townland near Bawnboy, County Cavan, the son of farmer Gregory McGovern and his wife Mary King of Derrynacreeve, County Cavan. He attended Bawnboy National School. In 1909 he married Dinah McManus and had ten children, seven sons and three daughters, living on Borim (Kinawley), Dernacrieve, Swanlinbar. 

He was elected to Dáil Éireann at the 1933 general election as a National Centre Party Teachta Dála (TD) for the Cavan constituency. He was re-elected at the 1937 general election for the same constituency as a Fine Gael TD, and again re-elected at the 1938 general election. He lost his seat at the 1943 general election.

References

1875 births
1949 deaths
National Centre Party (Ireland) TDs
Fine Gael TDs
Members of the 8th Dáil
Members of the 9th Dáil
Members of the 10th Dáil
Politicians from County Cavan
Irish farmers